The glucokinase regulatory protein (GKRP) also known as glucokinase (hexokinase 4) regulator (GCKR) is a protein produced in hepatocytes (liver cells). GKRP binds and moves glucokinase (GK), thereby controlling both activity and intracellular location of this key enzyme of glucose metabolism.

GKRP is a 68 kD protein of 626 amino acids. It is coded for by a 19 exon gene, GCKR, on the short arm of chromosome 2 (2p23). GKRP was discovered by Emile van Schaftingen and reported in 1989

Physiological function 

Glucokinase (GK) in liver cells phosphorylates glucose, preparing it for incorporation into glycogen or for glycolysis. During periods of ample glucose supply, most GK activity can be found in the peripheral cytoplasm where glycogen synthesis is occurring. As the glucose supply declines during periods of fasting, GK activity in the cytoplasm diminishes. GKRP participates in this modulation of GK activity and location by binding free cytoplasmic GK as glucose levels decline, and moving it into the nucleus, where it is held in reserve in an inactive form. As glucose and insulin levels rise, as during digestion of a meal, GK is released from GKRP and moves back to the cytoplasm, where much of it associates with the bifunctional enzyme.

In hepatocytes of various mammals, GKRP has always been found in molar excess of the amount of GK, but the GKRP:GK ratio varies according to diet, insulin sufficiency, and other factors. Free GKRP shuttles between the nucleus and the cytoplasm. It may be attached to the microfilament cytoskeleton.

GKRP competes with glucose to bind with GK, but inactivates it when bound. In conditions of low glucose, GKRP then pulls the GK into the nucleus. Rising amounts of glucose coming into the hepatocyte prompt the GKRP to rapidly release GK to return to the cytoplasm.

GKRP itself is subject to modulation. Fructose and sorbitol can both be converted to fructose-1-phosphate, which inhibits GKRP and frees GK. Fructose 6-phosphate binds to the same site of GKRP, but enhances the ability of GKRP to bind and inactivate GK. In contrast, phosphorylation of GKRP by AMP-activated protein kinase, induced by elevated levels of AMP, reduces its capacity to inactivate GK.

Presence of GKRP in other organs 

A presence and role of GKRP in other organs and tissues beyond the liver remains uncertain. Some researchers have finding small amounts of GKRP, or at least RNA coding for it, in small amounts in certain rat lung cells, in pancreatic islet cells, and in periventricular neurons of the hypothalamus in rats, but physiological function and significance in these organs are unknown.

Species differences 

GKRP was originally discovered in rat liver. GKRP was found to serve a similar function in livers of mice and humans as well as other animals. Cats are unusual in lacking GK activity, and have also been found to lack GKRP, though the genes for both GK and GKRP can be identified in the feline genome.

Clinical significance 

Many mutant forms of human GK are associated with impaired or amplified insulin secretion or action, resulting in higher or lower blood glucose levels, and either diabetes (MODY2) or hyperinsulinemic hypoglycemia, respectively.  Some of these variants have altered interaction with GKRP, which may contribute to the hyperglycemia.

The glucokinase of "knockout mice" who lack GKRP has a reduced expression and is entirely found in the cytoplasm. The knockout mice do not respond rapidly to glucose, exhibiting impaired glucose tolerance. 
Mutations of the GKRP gene (GCKR) in humans have been sought as possible causes of monogenic diabetes (MODY), but no examples have yet been discovered. However, variant forms of GCKR have been found to be associated with small differences in levels of glucose, insulin, triglycerides, C-reactive protein, and higher or lower risks for type 2 diabetes mellitus.

Activators of GK are being investigated as possible medicines for type 2 diabetes. One of the mechanisms of activation may be protection from binding by GKRP.

References 

Proteins